LLNM2 (an abbreviation of "Las Leyendas Nunca Mueren 2" in Spanish, meaning "Legends Never Die 2") is the fourth solo studio album, and fifth overall, by Puerto Rican rapper and singer Anuel AA. It was released on December 9, 2022, through Real Hasta la Muerte and Sony Music Latin. Formerly announced as an EP with the title Me Fui de Gira, the project follows his studio album Las Leyendas Nunca Mueren (2021) as its second part.

The album features collaborations with Omega, David Guetta, Jowell & Randy, De La Ghetto, Yailin La Más Viral, Bryant Myers, Mvsis, Kodak Black, Ñengo Flow, DaBaby, Treintisiete, Foreign Teck, Young Chimi, Lil Durk, Nicky Jam, RobGz, Zion and Randy.

Background 
After the release of his studio album Las Leyendas Nunca Mueren, Anuel AA decided to record a second part of the album. In April 2022 he uploaded a video for his Legends Never Die world tour. Later he announced the name of an upcoming extended play in an Instagram post and announced that it would include six or seven tracks. In multiple Instagram posts Anuel AA confirmed that he unifies Las Leyendas Nunca Mueren 2 and the EP Me Fui de Gira in a full studio album with the name LLNM2.

Release and promotion

Singles 
The first single of the album was "Malo", a collaboration with Zion and Randy released on July 14, 2022. The second single was "Mercedes Tintia", released on August 25, 2022.

Following the success of "Mercedes Tintia", Anuel released "Nosotros" on September 8, 2022. On September 14, 2022, he released the video of "Brother".

On September 30, 2022, he released the video of "La 2blea". The video of "El Nene", a collaboration with Foreign Teck followed on October 27, 2022.

On November 1, 2022, he released the video of "Diamantes en Mis Dientes" with Young Chimi, the video of "Si Yo Me Muero", with Puerto Rican producer Mvsis, was released on November 23, 2022.

On December 1, 2022, he released the video of "Hoodie" with Bryant Myers.

Track listing

Charts

References 

2022 albums
Anuel AA albums
Spanish-language albums
Albums produced by David Guetta